"Let It Out" is the third single by American alternative rock band Switchfoot, released on February 12, 2014.

Charts

References

2014 songs
Songs written by Jon Foreman
Switchfoot songs